Bheemunipatnam (also known as Bheemili), is a suburb of Visakhapatnam, India. The town was named after Bhima, a character in the Hindu epic Mahabharata. It formerly administered under the Bheemunipatnam municipality, but merged into GVMC in 2017. It is currently under the administration of Bheemunipatnam revenue division and the headquarters is located at Bheemunipatnam.

Geography 

Bheemunipatnam is located about 40 km from Visakhapatnam Airport, about 31 km from Visakhapatnam railway station and 29 km from Visakhapatnam city central bus station. It lies to the north of Visakhapatnam City and is loosely bordered by Rushikonda to the south and Bay of Bengal to the east, Madhurawada to the west, Bhogapuram to the north.

History

Buddhism 

Historical evidences of Buddhist Culture have been noticed at Bheemunipatnam dating back to 3rd century BCE on the hillock Pavurallakonda (also known as Narsimhaswami Konda locally) in the town. Buddhist remains were found during the excavations here along with Relic caskets. Both the schools of Buddhism Hinayana and Mahayana were propagated in this land and also to the far east lands from the port of River Gosthani. See pavurallakonda page for more details.

Narasimha temple 
There is a Hindu temple dedicated to Lord Narasimha on the eastern side of Pavurallakonda facing the sea. As per the historical evidences the temple is constructed around 14th century by Mindi Kings. There are two more temples in the town of Bhimili, which date back to the times of Chola's as Bheemeswaralayam and Choleswaralayam.

Dutch settlements 

Known to the Dutch as Bimilipatnam, Bheemunipatnam was one among the major Dutch settlements of the Dutch Coromandel coast in the 17th century. There are remnants of the Dutch East India Company trading post when the town was a port. The town contains one of the oldest Christian cemeteries on the coast. Bhimili also had a currency mint during the times of Dutch. Portuguese also visited bhimili in the same time as the dutch. St.Peter's church is a historical monument which signifies the ancient architecture.

After Bheemunipatnam was plundered by Maratha troops in 1754, the local regent permitted the Dutch East India Company to construct a fort in the village, for which military engineer Coenraad Pieter Keller drew up plans. The fort that was constructed subsequently collapsed twice, for which Keller had to defend himself in front of his superiors in Batavia.

East India Company 
The British East India Company made Bheemunipatnam their main trading base of the east coast. The Bhimili port used to operate passenger vessels to Madras and Calcutta during the British Raj. The big clock tower in the town was built by the British.

Bheemunipatnam Port Trust 
Bheemunipatnam (Bheemili ) was one of ancient Dutch harbour Town. European merchants disembarked from the ships and made it their port. It was a Major port and Europeans resided here during East India Company regime. Until 1958, huge ships from Malaysia and Singapore arrived at this port. Perfumes, textiles etc were exported to other countries from here. There was a huge coco plantation spread across the local beaches that were also exported. Bheemunipatnam Port Trust was closed during British rule in India to Develop Visakhapatnam Port Trust and avoid other invaders entering the country. However, the lighthouse constructed by the British at Bheemunipatnam port stands as a witness to the European regime.
Nowadays Andhra Pradesh Government Wants to open the port again.

Demographics 
According to Imperial Gazetteer of India, It was entirely Zamindari land belonging to the Vizianagram estate.  India census, it had a population of 44,156. Males constitute 49% of the population and females 51%. Bheemunipatnam has an average literacy rate of 60%, higher than the national average of 59.5%; with male literacy of 67% and female literacy of 54%. 11% of the population is under 6 years of age.

Landmarks 

The lighthouse dated to 1868 was built during Dutch settlement on the shores of Bheemili Beach. Some of the Buddhist sites are Bojjannakonda, Bavikonda, Lingalakonda, Pavurallakonda, Salihundam and Thotlakonda.

Politics

Bheemili Municipality (GVMC)

Transport

Bheemili is well connected by road. NH16 or AH45 passes through the Mandal. It also has major District roads and State Highways connecting it to nearby Mandals and Visakhapatnam. APSRTC runs bus services from Visakhapatnam bus station to Bheemili.
APSRTC
Routes:

Notes

References

External links 

Neighbourhoods in Visakhapatnam